One-Armed Swordsman is a 1967 Hong Kong wuxia film produced by the Shaw Brothers Studio. Directed by Chang Cheh, it was the first of the new style of wuxia films emphasizing male anti-heroes, violent swordplay and heavy bloodletting. It was the first Hong Kong film to make HK$1 million at the local box office, propelling its star Jimmy Wang to super stardom.

This film eventually became the first in the One-Armed Swordsman trilogy. A sequel was released in 1969 called Return of the One-Armed Swordsman, followed by The New One-Armed Swordsman in 1971, all directed by Chang Cheh. It has since achieved classic status in Hong Kong cinema. In the Hong Kong Film Award's 2005 poll, One-Armed Swordsman was voted as the 15th best Chinese-language film.

Plot
The Golden Sword school is attacked by bandits. The servant Fang Cheng sacrifices his life to protect his master Qi Ru Feng. In gratitude, Qi accepts the dying Fang Cheng's son, Fang Kang, as his student. Years later, Fang Kang is scorned by his snobbish fellow students because of his poor background. Deciding that he will only cause trouble for his master, Fang Kang leaves the school only to run into his classmates and his master's spoiled daughter, Pei Er. In the ensuing fight Fang's right arm is cut off by Pei Er, who is angry at his indifference towards her. Stumbling away, Fang falls off a bridge into the passing boat of a peasant girl Xiao Man.

Xiao Man nurses him back to health and the two fall in love. Fang Kang is nevertheless depressed as he is unable to practice his swordsmanship. Reluctantly, Xiao Man gives him a half-burnt kung-fu manual which she had inherited from her now dead parents. With its help, Fang Kang is able to master a new one-armed style of swordplay, making him stronger than before.

Meanwhile, master Qi Ru Feng is preparing for his 55th birthday and has invited all of his students to the celebration to choose a successor from amongst them so that he can retire from the martial arts world. However, his old enemies the Long-armed Devil and the Smiling Tiger Cheng are taking the opportunity to destroy Qi Ru Feng. Using a specially designed "sword-lock", they ambush and kill Qi's students travelling to the celebration.

Fang Kang inadvertently learns of the plot and, breaking his promise to Xiao Man not to involve himself in the martial arts world, rushes to save his master. He is delayed en route by the Long-Armed Devil's accomplices, and when he arrives the Long-Armed Devil has already killed most of the students and wounded Qi Ru Feng. In a vicious battle, Fang Kang manages to kill the Long-Armed Devil, but chooses to return to Xiao Man and become a farmer instead of taking his master's place at the school.

Cast
Jimmy Wang as Fang Kang
Lisa Chiao Chiao as Xiao Man
Tien Feng as Qi Ru Feng
Angela Pan as Qi Pei Er
Yeung Chi-hing as Long Armed Devil
Tang Ti as Smiling Tiger Cheng Tian Shou
Fan Mei-sheng as Guo Sheng / Brother Hua
Wong Sai-git as Qin Da Chuan
Cheung Pooi-saan as Sun Hao
Fan Dan as Feng's rich disciple
Ku Feng as Fang Chang
Chen Yen-yen as Feng's wife

Reception
The film's box office success earned Chang Cheh the epithet "One Million Dollar Director", established Jimmy Wang Yu as a star, and helped to secure the popularity of the Shaw Brothers Studio and martial arts cinema.

The modern reception of the film in Hong Kong and Taiwan is positive. At the 24th Hong Kong Film Awards various Asian film critics, film makers and actors voted for the top Chinese films from Hong Kong, Taiwan and China. One-Armed Swordsman was listed at 15th place on the list. In 2011, the Tapei Golden Horse Film Festival had 122 industry professionals take part in the survey. The voters included film scholars, festival programmers, film directors, actors and producers to vote for the 100 Greatest Chinese-Language Films. One-Armed Swordsman was listed at 73rd place on the list.

Legacy
Chang Cheh directed a sequel in 1969, Return of the One-Armed Swordsman, which was also produced by the Shaw Brothers Studio with Jimmy Wang reprising his role as Fang Kang (or Fang Gang). In 1971, Cheh made a third one-armed swordsman film for Shaw Brothers, The New One-Armed Swordsman, starring David Chiang as a different one-armed swordsman.

The popularity of these films led to imitations by other studios and Jimmy Wang playing similar one-armed characters on several occasions, beginning with the Japanese film Zatoichi and the One-Armed Swordsman in 1971, in which he was paired with the blind swordsman Zatoichi (Shintaro Katsu). Also in 1971, Wang directed and starred in One-Armed Boxer, combining elements of the One-Armed Swordsman and The Chinese Boxer films he had previously made with Shaw Brothers. In 1976 he appeared in three other films with this trope: Master of the Flying Guillotine (a sequel to One-Armed Boxer), One-Armed Swordsman Against Nine Killers and One-Armed Swordsmen, which starred and was co-directed by Jimmy Wang and David Chiang, playing rival one-armed swordsmen.

In 1995, director and producer Tsui Hark created The Blade, an original story about a one-armed fighter inspired by the one-armed swordsman films of the 1960s and 70s.

References

External links

Review at Kung Fu Cinema

1967 films
1960s action films
1960s martial arts films
Hong Kong action films
Hong Kong martial arts films
1960s Mandarin-language films
Wuxia films
Shaw Brothers Studio films
Films directed by Chang Cheh
Films shot in Hong Kong
Films about amputees